The Lingen transmitting station is an FM radio and digital television transmission facility owned by Norddeutscher Rundfunk and sited near the town of Lingen in Lower Saxony, Germany.

The following services are radiated from its 227-metre-high guyed grounded tubular-steel mast:

FM radio

Digital terrestrial television

Norddeutscher Rundfunk
Radio masts and towers in Germany
Buildings and structures in Emsland